Kameshwar Choupal is an Indian Politician and  a member of the Bihar Legislative Council. He was elected to Bihar Council in 2002.

He contested the 2014 Lok Sabha elections from Supaul, Bihar on the Bharatiya Janata Party ticket.

References

Living people
Members of the Bihar Legislative Council
People from Supaul district
National Democratic Alliance candidates in the 2014 Indian general election
Place of birth missing (living people)
Bharatiya Janata Party politicians from Bihar
1956 births